OTD (abbr. "on this day") is an American brand founded by designer John Varvatos after he exited his namesake brand in 2020. OTD has the flagship store located in the heart of New York City's SoHo neighborhood, while founding a second home in Los Angeles on West Hollywood's iconic Sunset Strip. OTD plans to be more tied to pop culture, will be offering elevated and reimagined silhouettes for men and women and will be more relaxed lifestyle brand.

References

2020s fashion
Clothing brands of the United States
Privately held companies based in New York City
2021 establishments in New York (state)
American companies established in 2021